Farahdokht Abbas Taleghani, known by the stage name Pouran, was a pre-revolutionary Iranian pop and classical singer.

Albums

Molla Mammad Jaan

Ashkam Dooneh Dooneh

Gol Omad Bahar Omad

See also

 Music of Iran
 Persian women musicians
 Persian pop music

External links

 

1934 births
1990 deaths
People from Tehran
Deaths from cancer
Singers from Tehran
Actresses from Tehran
Iranian women singers
Women singers on Golha
Iranian film actresses
Persian-language singers
Iranian women pop singers
20th-century women singers
Iranian singer-songwriters
Burials at Emamzadeh Taher
20th-century Iranian singers
20th-century Iranian actresses
20th-century Iranian women singers